The 1990 Lufthansa Cup German Open was a women's tennis tournament played on outdoor clay courts at the Rot-Weiss Tennis Club in West Berlin, West Germany that was part of the Tier I category of the 1990 WTA Tour. It was the 21st edition of the tournament and was held from 14 May until 20 May 1990. Second-seeded Monica Seles won the singles title, snapping world no.1 Steffi Graf's 66-match winning streak in the final (2nd in WTA history behind Martina Navratilova's 74-match winning streak).

Finals

Singles

 Monica Seles defeated  Steffi Graf 6–4, 6–3
 It was Seles' 5th singles title of the year and the 6th of her career.

Doubles

 Nicole Provis /  Elna Reinach defeated  Hana Mandlíková /  Jana Novotná 6–2, 6–1

References

External links
 ITF tournament edition details
 Tournament draws

Lufthansa Cup
WTA German Open
May 1990 sports events in Europe
1990 in German tennis